The Jordan national under-20 football team is the national under-20 football team of Jordan and is controlled by the Jordan Football Association. This team can also be managed as an under-18 or under-19 team if necessary. 

The team has qualified once for the FIFA U-20 World Cup in 2007. The team has also qualified for the AFC U-20 Asian Cup on a total of 8 occasions, most recently in 2023. Finally, Jordan has qualified for the Arab Cup U-20 on a total of 4 occasions, with their best finish being a Quarter-finals spot in 2022.

Recent results and fixtures

The following is a list of match results in the last 12 months, as well as any future matches that have been scheduled.

2023

Coaching staff

Current personnel

Players

Current squad
The following under-20 players were called-up for the 2023 AFC U-20 Asian Cup, held on March 2023.

Head coach: Islam Al Diabat

Coaching history 
  Math'har Al-Saeed (1986-1989)
  Jan Poulsen (2006-2007)
  Ahmed Abdel-Qader (2007-2008)
  Mohammad Abdel-Azim (2009-2010)
  Jamal Abu Abed (2011-2012) 
  Bibert Kaghado (2013-2014)
  Islam Al-Diabat (2015)
  Ahmed Abdel-Qader (2016-2018)
  Islam Al-Diabat (2021-)

Kit providers
Jako (2006–2011)
Adidas (2011-2012)
Jako (2012-)

Competitive record

FIFA U-20 World Cup record

AFC U-20 Asian Cup

U-20 Arab Cup

WAFF U-18 championship record

See also
 Jordan national football team
 Jordan national under-23 football team 
 Jordan national under-17 football team 
 Jordan national under-14 football team
 Jordan women's national football team

References

External links

u20
Asian national under-20 association football teams